Korat Football Club (Thai สโมสรฟุตบอลโคราช), is a Thai football club based in Nakhon Ratchasima, Thailand. The club is currently playing in the 2017 Thailand Amateur League North Eastern Region.

Record

References

External links
 

Association football clubs established in 2007
Football clubs in Thailand
Nakhon Ratchasima province
2007 establishments in Thailand